The grey monjita (Nengetus cinereus) is a species of bird in the family Tyrannidae that is the only member of the genus Nengetus. It is found in Argentina, Bolivia, Brazil, Paraguay, Peru, Suriname, and Uruguay. Its natural habitats are dry savanna, subtropical or tropical seasonally wet or flooded lowland grassland, and pastureland.

Taxonomy
This species was formerly placed in the genus Xolmis but was moved to the resurrected genus Nengetus following the publication of a genetic analysis in 2020.

References

grey monjita
Birds of South America
grey monjita
Taxa named by Louis Jean Pierre Vieillot
Articles containing video clips
Taxonomy articles created by Polbot
Taxobox binomials not recognized by IUCN